Espinal, Spanish for spine, may refer to:

People
Espinal (surname)

Places
Argentine Espinal, an ecoregion in Argentina
Espinal, Navarre, Spain
Espinal, Veracruz, Mexico
El Espinal, Oaxaca, Mexico
El Espinal, Tolima, Colombia